Montra is the short version of the Pahlavi word "Mahantra" meaning protection, its origin from the Kurdish word "Pala" meaning to take refuge under. 

This name dates back to the pre-Zoroastrian times (Medes era, 3700 years ago) in ancient Iran. This word belongs to the Avestan language from the old Indo-Iranian language group, which was used to write the Gathas in Kurdish Gwet, meaning "spoken" or "the spoken words". The term Montra, though rarely, is used as a girls name nowadays and should not be confused with the Indian word mantra, which is a religious or mystical syllable or poem, typically from the Sanskrit language.

Ancient history of Iran